        
Keadby is a small village in North Lincolnshire, England. It is situated just off the A18, west of Scunthorpe, and on the west bank of the River Trent. Keadby is in the ceremonial county of Lincolnshire. The appropriate civil parish is called Keadby with Althorpe with a population at the 2011 census of 1,930.

History
The place-name 'Keadby' is first attested in 1185, where it appears as Ketebi in the Records of the Templars in England. The name means "Keti's by", 'Keti' being an Old Danish name and 'by' meaning a village or homestead in Old Scandinavian.

Keadby's economic significance lies in that it was chosen as the destination for the Stainforth and Keadby Canal, opened in 1802. The canal is now mostly a leisure waterway for pleasure boaters, with Keadby being at the "end of the line". There is a lock between the canal and the tidal River Trent. At Keadby are the Keadby Power Stations, and 'Port Services', a small port for inward-bound timber and scrap metal.

The village was served by the South Yorkshire Railway. A railway station served the village until the late 1870s-80s. When it was closed, another station opened at Althorpe instead. This is the closest one to the village.

King George V Bridge

The King George V Bridge (also known as Keadby Lifting Bridge) provides a crossing for twin rail lines, a road and a pedestrian walkway over the Trent, connecting the Isle of Axholme to Scunthorpe and the rest of North Lincolnshire. The bridge opened on 21 May 1916, at which time the 3,000-ton lifting span was Europe's heaviest bascule bridge. The lifting span was fixed in position in 1955 and no longer opens.

Moveable bridges
The King George V Bridge is not the only moveable bridge in the vicinity of Keadby. There are canal locks at the point where the Stainforth and Keadby Canal connects with the River Trent in Keadby. On the canal, just before these locks, the B1392 road crosses the canal over the Keadby Swing Bridge. Approximately  farther along the canal, a railway line crosses the canal over the Keadby Sliding Bridge, also known as Vazon Sliding Railway Bridge. This is an unusual retractable bridge that can be rolled out of the line of the canal to allow boats through. Just beyond the sliding bridge is a small manually operated swing bridge.

References

External links 

Isle of Axholme website
Friends of Althorpe and Keadby Primary School
Pathe newsreel of flooding (unknown date) & bridge
Pathe newsreel of the King George V bridge being lifted

Villages in the Borough of North Lincolnshire
Road-rail bridges